Wildlife refers to undomesticated animal species, but has come to include all organisms that grow or live wild in an area without being introduced by humans. Wildlife was also synonymous to game: those birds and mammals that were hunted for sport. Wildlife can be found in all ecosystems. Deserts, plains, grasslands, woodlands, forests, and other areas, including the most developed urban areas, all have distinct forms of wildlife. While the term in popular culture usually refers to animals that are untouched by human factors, most scientists agree that much wildlife is affected by human activities. Some wildlife threaten human safety, health, property, and quality of life. However, many wild animals, even the dangerous ones, have value to human beings. This value might be economic, educational, or emotional in nature.

Humans have historically tended to separate civilization from wildlife in a number of ways, including the legal, social, and moral senses. Some animals, however, have adapted to suburban environments. This includes such animals as feral cats, dogs, mice, and rats. Some religions declare certain animals to be sacred, and in modern times, concern for the natural environment has provoked activists to protest against the exploitation of wildlife for human benefit or entertainment.

Global wildlife populations have decreased by 68% since 1970 as a result of human activity, particularly overconsumption, population growth, and intensive farming, according to a 2020 World Wildlife Fund's Living Planet Report and the Zoological Society of London's Living Planet Index measure, which is further evidence that humans have unleashed a sixth mass extinction event. According to CITES, it has been estimated that annually the international wildlife trade amounts to billions of dollars and it affects hundreds of millions of animal and plant specimen.

Interactions with humans

Trade

For food 
Stone Age people and hunter-gatherers relied on wildlife, both plants and animals, for their food. In fact, some species may have been hunted to extinction by early human hunters. Today, hunting, fishing, and gathering wildlife is still a significant food source in some parts of the world. In other areas, hunting and non-commercial fishing are mainly seen as a sport or recreation. Meat sourced from wildlife that is not traditionally regarded as game is known as bushmeat. The increasing demand for wildlife as a source of traditional food in East Asia is decimating populations of sharks, primates, pangolins and other animals, which they believe have aphrodisiac properties.

A November 2008 report from biologist and author Sally Kneidel, PhD, documented numerous wildlife species for sale in informal markets along the Amazon River, including wild-caught marmosets sold for as little as $1.60 (5 Peruvian soles). Many Amazon species, including peccaries, agoutis, turtles, turtle eggs, anacondas, armadillos are sold primarily as food.

Media 

Wildlife has long been a common subject for educational television shows. National Geographic Society specials appeared on CBS since 1965, later moving to American Broadcasting Company and then Public Broadcasting Service. In 1963, NBC debuted Wild Kingdom, a popular program featuring zoologist Marlin Perkins as host. The BBC natural history unit in the United Kingdom was a similar pioneer, the first wildlife series LOOK presented by Sir Peter Scott, was a studio-based show, with filmed inserts. David Attenborough first made his appearance in this series, which was followed by the series Zoo Quest during which he and cameraman Charles Lagus went to many exotic places looking for and filming elusive wildlife—notably the Komodo dragon in Indonesia and lemurs in Madagascar.
Since 1984, the Discovery Channel and its spinoff Animal Planet in the US have dominated the market for shows about wildlife on cable television, while on Public Broadcasting Service the NATURE strand made by WNET-13 in New York and NOVA by WGBH in Boston are notable. Wildlife television is now a multimillion-dollar industry with specialist documentary film-makers in many countries including UK, US, New Zealand, Australia, Austria, Germany, Japan, and Canada.
There are many magazines and websites which cover wildlife including National Wildlife Magazine, Birds & Blooms, Birding (magazine), wildlife.net and Ranger Rick for children.

Religion 
Many animal species have spiritual significance in different cultures around the world, and they and their products may be used as sacred objects in religious rituals. For example, eagles, hawks and their feathers have great cultural and spiritual value to Native Americans as religious objects. In Hinduism the cow is regarded as sacred.

Muslims conduct sacrifices on Eid al-Adha, to commemorate the sacrificial spirit of Ibrāhīm in Islam ( Arabic-Abraham) in love of God. Camels, sheep, goats may be offered as sacrifice during the three days of Eid.

In Christianity the Bible has a variety of animal symbols, the Lamb is a famous title of Jesus. In the New Testament the Gospels Mark, Luke and John have animal symbols: "Mark is a lion, Luke is a bull and John is an eagle."

Tourism

Suffering

Loss and extinction

This subsection focuses on anthropogenic forms of wildlife destruction. The loss of animals from ecological communities is also known as defaunation.

Exploitation of wild populations has been a characteristic of modern man since our exodus from Africa 130,000 – 70,000 years ago. The rate of extinctions of entire species of plants and animals across the planet has been so high in the last few hundred years it is widely believed that we are in the sixth great extinction event on earth; the Holocene Mass Extinction. The 2019 Global Assessment Report on Biodiversity and Ecosystem Services, published by the United Nations' Intergovernmental Science-Policy Platform on Biodiversity and Ecosystem Services, says that roughly one million species of plants and animals face extinction within decades as the result of human actions.

Destruction of wildlife does not always lead to an extinction of the species in question, however, the dramatic loss of entire species across Earth dominates any review of wildlife destruction as extinction is the level of damage to a wild population from which there is no return.

The four most general reasons that lead to destruction of wildlife include overkill, habitat destruction and fragmentation, impact of introduced species and chains of extinction.

Overkill
Overkill happens whenever hunting occurs at rates greater than the reproductive capacity of the population is being exploited. The effects of this are often noticed much more dramatically in slow-growing populations such as many larger species of fish. Initially when a portion of a wild population is hunted, an increased availability of resources (food, etc.) is experienced increasing growth and reproduction as density dependent inhibition is lowered. Hunting, fishing and so on, has lowered the competition between members of a population. However, if this hunting continues at rate greater than the rate at which new members of the population can reach breeding age and produce more young, the population will begin to decrease in numbers.

Populations that are confined to islands, whether literal islands or just areas of habitat that are effectively an "island" for the species concerned, have also been observed to be at greater risk of dramatic population rise of deaths declines following unsustainable hunting.

Habitat destruction and fragmentation

The habitat of any given species is considered its preferred area or territory. Many processes associated with human habitation of an area cause loss of this area and decrease the carrying capacity of the land for that species. In many cases these changes in land use cause a patchy break-up of the wild landscape. Agricultural land frequently displays this type of extremely fragmented, or relictual, habitat. Farms sprawl across the landscape with patches of uncleared woodland or forest dotted in-between occasional paddocks.

Examples of habitat destruction include grazing of bushland by farmed animals, changes to natural fire regimes, forest clearing for timber production and wetland draining for city expansion.

Impact of introduced species

 Mice, cats, rabbits, dandelions and poison ivy are all examples of species that have become invasive threats to wild species in various parts of the world. Frequently species that are uncommon in their home range become out-of-control invasions in distant but similar climates. The reasons for this have not always been clear and Charles Darwin felt it was unlikely that exotic species would ever be able to grow abundantly in a place in which they had not evolved. The reality is that the vast majority of species exposed to a new habitat do not reproduce successfully. Occasionally, however, some populations do take hold and after a period of acclimation can increase in numbers significantly, having destructive effects on many elements of the native environment of which they have become part.

Chains of extinction
This final group is one of secondary effects. All wild populations of living things have many complex intertwining links with other living things around them. Large herbivorous animals such as the hippopotamus have populations of insectivorous birds that feed off the many parasitic insects that grow on the hippo. Should the hippo die out, so too will these groups of birds, leading to further destruction as other species dependent on the birds are affected. Also referred to as a domino effect, this series of chain reactions is by far the most destructive process that can occur in any ecological community.

Another example is the black drongos and the cattle egrets found in India. These birds feed on insects on the back of cattle, which helps to keep them disease-free. Destroying the nesting habitats of these birds would cause a decrease in the cattle population because of the spread of insect-borne diseases.

See also

Do not feed the animals
Endangered species
Ex situ conservation
In situ conservation
Wildlife corridor
Wildness
World Wildlife Day

References

External links

Wild Species